Damascus is an unincorporated community in Coffee County, Alabama, United States.

History
A post office operated under the name Damascus from 1885 to 1907.

References

Unincorporated communities in Coffee County, Alabama
Unincorporated communities in Alabama